Fullastern Rock is an isolated submerged rock lying in the middle of Johnston Passage  west-northwest of Cape Adriasola, Adelaide Island. The rock is potentially dangerous to ships and was so named when the RRS John Biscoe was compelled to go full astern to avoid this hazard.

References

Rock formations of Adelaide Island